James Henry Whitlock  (May 15, 1829 - July 11, 1901) served in the California legislature and during the American Civil War he served in the US Army.

References

Union Army personnel
Members of the California State Legislature
19th-century American politicians
1829 births
1901 deaths